The London Festival of Architecture is a festival specialised in architecture. It takes place annually in London, United Kingdom usually through the month of June. It features an extensive range of activities that focus on design and architecture: exhibitions; installations; talks; debates; open studios; tours; family activities; film screenings; student shows, and evenings.

History and organisation 
The London Festival of Architecture (LFA) is Europe's biggest annual architecture festival. It was founded by former director Peter Murray in 2004. Up until 2006, the festival was only held once every two years and was previously known as the London Architecture Biennale. From 2008 onwards, the festival took place on an annual basis. Tamsie Thomson serves on the board as the Director of the London Festival of Architecture.

Themes 
Themes are chosen each year for the festival.

 2016: "Community"
 2017: "Memory"
 2018: "Identity"
 2019: "Boundaries"
 2020: "Power"
 2021: "Care"
 2022: "Act"

Key events and highlights 
 IP_DO Dulwich Picture Gallery pavilion
 The London Festival of Architecture Fringe
 Debates
 Great Architectural Bake-Off
 Exhibition of winning entries to Silvertown Flyover Design Competition

References 

Architecture festivals
Annual events in London
Festivals in London